Tomas Ress (born August 22, 1980) is an Italian professional basketball player who last played for Reyer Venezia of the Lega Basket Serie A (LBA). Standing at 2.11 m (6 ft 11 in), he plays at the center position.

Amateur career
Ress played high school basketball at Champagnat Catholic School in Hialeah, Florida. He then played college basketball at Texas A&M University with the Texas A&M Aggies.

Professional career
Ress began his pro career with Virtus Bologna during the 1997-98 season. He then moved to Victoria Libertas Pesaro, before joining Fortitudo Bologna. He then moved to Pallacanestro Reggio Emilia, before moving to Montepaschi Siena. 

In July 2014, he signed with Reyer Venezia Mestre. On May 2, 2018, Ress won his second European cup after winning the FIBA Europe Cup with Reyer. On July 26, 2018, Ress officially part ways with Venezia.

Italian national team
Rees played with the Italian national basketball team at the 2005 Mediterranean Games, where he won the gold medal.

Personal
Ress' sister is former WNBA player Kathrin Ress.

References

External links
 Euroleague.net Profile
 Eurobasket.com Profile
 Italian League Profile 
 ESPN.com College Profile

1980 births
Living people
Centers (basketball)
Fortitudo Pallacanestro Bologna players
Italian men's basketball players
Italian expatriate basketball people in the United States
Lega Basket Serie A players
Mens Sana Basket players
Pallacanestro Reggiana players
Power forwards (basketball)
Reyer Venezia players
Texas A&M Aggies men's basketball players
Victoria Libertas Pallacanestro players
Virtus Bologna players
Mediterranean Games gold medalists for Italy
Competitors at the 2005 Mediterranean Games
Mediterranean Games medalists in basketball